Thomas and Lois Wheless House is a historic home located at Louisburg, Franklin County, North Carolina.  It was built in 1954–1955, and is a one-story, rectangular Modern Movement style dwelling of glass, wood, and stone.  It has a low-pitched gable roof, rests on a concrete-slab foundation, and measures 30 feet wide and 72 feet deep.

It was listed on the National Register of Historic Places in 2007.

References

External links 

 Guide to the Wheless Family Papers 1950-1995

Houses on the National Register of Historic Places in North Carolina
Modern Movement architecture in the United States
Houses completed in 1955
Houses in Franklin County, North Carolina
National Register of Historic Places in Franklin County, North Carolina
1955 establishments in North Carolina